Verkhivtseve is a city in Kamianske Raion, Dnipropetrovsk Oblast (province) of Ukraine. Verkhivtseve hosts the administration of Verkhivtseve urban hromada, one of the hromadas of Ukraine. Population: 

In 2001, the population was 10,142. Verkhivtseve has a railway station. The area is mostly forested. The settlement of Verkhivtseve got status of city in 1956.

Until 18 July 2020, Verkhivtseve belonged to Verkhnodniprovsk Raion. The raion was abolished in July 2020 as part of the administrative reform of Ukraine, which reduced the number of raions of Dnipropetrovsk Oblast to seven. The area of Verkhnodniprovsk Raion was merged into Kamianske Raion.

References

External link 
 Учётная карточка города на сайте Верховной рады Украины.

Cities in Dnipropetrovsk Oblast
Cities of district significance in Ukraine
Populated places established in the Russian Empire